Christopher Jay Browning (born March 8, 1964) is an American television and film actor, known for film work and character roles.

Career
Browning began his acting career in 1987, at age 22 or 23, with a sitcom television series. Due to his drug problems at the time, he spent several years homeless and also served time in jail. He sought treatment for his addiction in 1994. He was cast in the miniseries Hardball as Lloyd LaCombe. He was later cast in a recurring role in In the House, His first major role in a film came in 1996, in The Children of Captain Grant which was filmed in Russia. He also had a recurring role in the day-time soap, As the World Turns as David Allen. After not appearing in films and movies between 1999 and 2005 due to his rehabilitation, he made an appearance in the film, A Piece of Pie. In that same year, he was cast in his first big budget film, 3:10 to Yuma. After this he was cast in television shows such as Easy Money and the 2008 film Felon.

In mid-2008, he was cast in the Terminator reboot, Terminator Salvation as "Morrison". He also had roles in movies such as Let Me In, Cowboys & Aliens, The Last Stand, The Book of Eli, and Wild Card.

He plays Aryan Brotherhood member "Redwood" in the prison movie Shot Caller, directed by Ric Roman Waugh.

Brownings's television work includes season three of Ray Donavan. He also appeared in episodes of HBO's Westworld, Marvel's Agent Carter, Supergirl, Major Crimes, CSI, Graceland, Castle, Bones, The Bridge, three episodes of From Dusk Till Dawn, and as the character "Gogo" in the fifth season of Sons of Anarchy.

Browning was also a voice actor in the 2017 video game Call of Duty: WWII. He voiced the main character's deceased older brother Paul Thomas Daniels.

Personal life
Browning has two daughters with ex-wife Sarah Browning, born in 2006 and 2011. With his second wife, Chrissy Lucia, he had twins, a boy and a girl, however his son died shortly after birth.

Filmography

Film

Television

Video games

References

External links

1964 births
Living people
American male film actors
American male television actors
Male actors from Nevada
20th-century American male actors
21st-century American male actors
Actors from Reno, Nevada